Prince Władysław Hieronim Sanguszko (1803–1870) was a Polish nobleman, landowner, and conservative politician.

Władysław participated in the November Uprising in 1830–1831. He was owner of Gumniśki estate and ran there an Arabian horse stud farm. From 1861 to 1869 member of the National Sejm in Galicia and member of the Herrenhaus. An opposite of the January Uprising of 1863–1864. Since 1854 chairman of the "Society of Friends of Arts" in Kraków.

Family

He was married to his maternal first cousin Princess Izabella Maria Lubomirska and had five children:

 Pawel Roman Sanguszko
 Jadwiga Klementyna Sanguszko
 Roman Damian Sanguszko
 Eustachy Stanisław Sanguszko
 Helena Sanguszko

His older brother Prince Roman Sanguszko was compelled to walk the entire way to Siberia (about 3300 km) in chains for his part in the November Uprising by personal order of the Russian Czar.

Works
 O sztuce chowu koni i utrzymaniu stada, 1850

References

1803 births
1870 deaths
People from Slavuta
People from Volhynian Governorate
Polish politicians
November Uprising participants
Wladyslaw Hieronim
Members of the Diet of Galicia and Lodomeria
Members of the House of Deputies (Austria)
Members of the House of Lords (Austria)